Zarif is an Arabic masculine given name, meaning "elegant". The feminine equivalent is Zarifa.

References

Arabic given names